Karl Brown may refer to:

Karl Brown (cricketer) (born 1988), English cricketer
Karl Brown (cinematographer) (1896–1990), pioneer American cinematographer
Karl Brown, member of the 1980s music group Automatic Pilot
Karl 'Tuff Enuff' Brown, UK garage DJ from Double Trouble and Tuff Jam

See also
Carl Brown (disambiguation)